Charltona albidalis is a moth in the family Crambidae. It was described by George Hampson in 1919. It is found in Sierra Leone and South Sudan.

References

Crambinae
Moths described in 1919
Taxa named by George Hampson